This is a list of electoral division results for the Australian 1980 federal election.

Overall
This section is an excerpt from 1980 Australian federal election § House of Representatives results

New South Wales

Banks 
This section is an excerpt from Electoral results for the Division of Banks § 1980

Barton 
This section is an excerpt from Electoral results for the Division of Barton § 1980

Bennelong 
This section is an excerpt from Electoral results for the Division of Bennelong § 1980

Berowra 
This section is an excerpt from Electoral results for the Division of Berowra § 1980

Blaxland 
This section is an excerpt from Electoral results for the Division of Blaxland § 1980

Bradfield 
This section is an excerpt from Electoral results for the Division of Bradfield § 1980

Calare 
This section is an excerpt from Electoral results for the Division of Calare § 1980

Chifley 
This section is an excerpt from Electoral results for the Division of Chifley § 1980

Cook 
This section is an excerpt from Electoral results for the Division of Cook § 1980

Cowper 
This section is an excerpt from Electoral results for the Division of Cowper § 1980

Cunningham 
This section is an excerpt from Electoral results for the Division of Cunningham § 1980

Dundas 
This section is an excerpt from Electoral results for the Division of Dundas § 1980

Eden-Monaro 
This section is an excerpt from Electoral results for the Division of Eden-Monaro § 1980

Farrer 
This section is an excerpt from Electoral results for the Division of Farrer § 1980

Grayndler 
This section is an excerpt from Electoral results for the Division of Grayndler § 1980

Gwydir 
This section is an excerpt from Electoral results for the Division of Gwydir § 1980

Hughes 
This section is an excerpt from Electoral results for the Division of Hughes § 1980

Hume 
This section is an excerpt from Electoral results for the Division of Hume § 1980

Hunter 
This section is an excerpt from Electoral results for the Division of Hunter § 1980

Kingsford Smith 
This section is an excerpt from Electoral results for the Division of Kingsford Smith § 1980

Lowe 
This section is an excerpt from Electoral results for the Division of Lowe § 1980

Lyne 
This section is an excerpt from Electoral results for the Division of Lyne § 1980

Macarthur 
This section is an excerpt from Electoral results for the Division of Macarthur § 1980

Mackellar 
This section is an excerpt from Electoral results for the Division of Mackellar § 1980

Macquarie 
This section is an excerpt from Electoral results for the Division of Macquarie § 1980

Mitchell 
This section is an excerpt from Electoral results for the Division of Mitchell § 1980

New England 
This section is an excerpt from Electoral results for the Division of New England § 1980

Newcastle 
This section is an excerpt from Electoral results for the Division of Newcastle1980

North Sydney 
This section is an excerpt from Electoral results for the Division of North Sydney § 1980

Parramatta 
This section is an excerpt from Electoral results for the Division of Parramatta § 1980

Paterson 
This section is an excerpt from Electoral results for the Division of Paterson § 1980

Phillip 
This section is an excerpt from Electoral results for the Division of Phillip § 1980

Prospect 
This section is an excerpt from Electoral results for the Division of Prospect § 1980

Reid
This section is an excerpt from Electoral results for the Division of Reid § 1980

Richmond 
This section is an excerpt from Electoral results for the Division of Richmond § 1980

Riverina 
This section is an excerpt from Electoral results for the Division of Riverina § 1980

Robertson 
This section is an excerpt from Electoral results for the Division of Robertson § 1980

Shortland 
This section is an excerpt from Electoral results for the Division of Shortland § 1980

St George 
This section is an excerpt from Electoral results for the Division of St George § 1980

Sydney 
This section is an excerpt from Electoral results for the Division of Sydney § 1980

Warringah 
This section is an excerpt from Electoral results for the Division of Warringah § 1980

Wentworth 
This section is an excerpt from Electoral results for the Division of Wentworth § 1980

Werriwa 
This section is an excerpt from Electoral results for the Division of Werriwa § 1980

Victoria

Balaclava 
This section is an excerpt from Electoral results for the Division of Balaclava § 1980

Ballaarat 
This section is an excerpt from Electoral results for the Division of Ballarat § 1980

Batman 
This section is an excerpt from Electoral results for the Division of Batman § 1980

Bendigo 
This section is an excerpt from Electoral results for the Division of Bendigo § 1980

Bruce 
This section is an excerpt from Electoral results for the Division of Bruce § 1980

Burke 
This section is an excerpt from Electoral results for the Division of Burke (1969–2004) § 1980

Casey 
This section is an excerpt from Electoral results for the Division of Casey § 1980

Chisholm 
This section is an excerpt from Electoral results for the Division of Chisholm § 1980

Corangamite 
This section is an excerpt from Electoral results for the Division of Corangamite § 1980

Corio 
This section is an excerpt from Electoral results for the Division of Corio § 1980

Deakin 
This section is an excerpt from Electoral results for the Division of Deakin § 1980

Diamond Valley 
This section is an excerpt from Electoral results for the Division of Diamond Valley § 1980

Flinders 
This section is an excerpt from Electoral results for the Division of Flinders § 1980

Gellibrand 
This section is an excerpt from Electoral results for the Division of Gellibrand § 1980

Gippsland 
This section is an excerpt from Electoral results for the Division of Gippsland § 1980

Henty 
This section is an excerpt from Electoral results for the Division of Henty § 1980

Higgins 
This section is an excerpt from Electoral results for the Division of Higgins § 1980

Holt 
This section is an excerpt from Electoral results for the Division of Holt § 1980

Hotham 
This section is an excerpt from Electoral results for the Division of Hotham § 1980

Indi 
This section is an excerpt from Electoral results for the Division of Indi § 1980

Isaacs 
This section is an excerpt from Electoral results for the Division of Isaacs § 1980

Kooyong 
This section is an excerpt from Electoral results for the Division of Kooyong § 1980

La Trobe 
This section is an excerpt from Electoral results for the Division of La Trobe § 1980

Lalor 
This section is an excerpt from Electoral results for the Division of Lalor § 1980

Mallee 
This section is an excerpt from Electoral results for the Division of Mallee § 1980

Maribyrnong 
This section is an excerpt from Electoral results for the Division of Maribyrnong § 1980

McMillan 
This section is an excerpt from Electoral results for the Division of McMillan § 1980

Melbourne 
This section is an excerpt from Electoral results for the Division of Melbourne § 1980

Melbourne Ports 
This section is an excerpt from Electoral results for the Division of Melbourne Ports § 1980

Murray 
This section is an excerpt from Electoral results for the Division of Murray § 1980

Scullin 
This section is an excerpt from Electoral results for the Division of Scullin § 1980

Wannon 
This section is an excerpt from Electoral results for the Division of Wannon § 1980

Wills 
This section is an excerpt from Electoral results for the Division of Wills § 1980

Queensland

Bowman 
This section is an excerpt from Electoral results for the Division of Bowman § 1980

Brisbane 
This section is an excerpt from Electoral results for the Division of Brisbane § 1980

Capricornia 
This section is an excerpt from Electoral results for the Division of Capricornia § 1980

Darling Downs 
This section is an excerpt from Electoral results for the Division of Darling Downs § 1980

Dawson 
This section is an excerpt from Electoral results for the Division of Dawson § 1980

Fadden 
This section is an excerpt from Electoral results for the Division of Fadden § 1980

Fisher 
This section is an excerpt from Electoral results for the Division of Fisher § 1980

Griffith 
This section is an excerpt from Electoral results for the Division of Griffith § 1980

Herbert 
This section is an excerpt from Electoral results for the Division of Herbert § 1980

Kennedy 
This section is an excerpt from Electoral results for the Division of Kennedy § 1980

Leichhardt 
This section is an excerpt from Electoral results for the Division of Leichhardt § 1980

Lilley 
This section is an excerpt from Electoral results for the Division of Lilley § 1980

Maranoa 
This section is an excerpt from Electoral results for the Division of Maranoa § 1980

McPherson 
This section is an excerpt from Electoral results for the Division of McPherson § 1980

Moreton 
This section is an excerpt from Electoral results for the Division of Moreton § 1980

Oxley 
This section is an excerpt from Electoral results for the Division of Oxley § 1980

Petrie 
This section is an excerpt from Electoral results for the Division of Petrie § 1980

Ryan 
This section is an excerpt from Electoral results for the Division of Ryan § 1980

Wide Bay 
This section is an excerpt from Electoral results for the Division of Wide Bay § 1980

South Australia

Adelaide 
This section is an excerpt from Electoral results for the Division of Adelaide § 1980

Barker 
This section is an excerpt from Electoral results for the Division of Barker § 1980

Bonython 
This section is an excerpt from Electoral results for the Division of Bonython § 1980

Boothby 
This section is an excerpt from Electoral results for the Division of Boothby § 1980

Grey 
This section is an excerpt from Electoral results for the Division of Grey § 1980

Hawker 
This section is an excerpt from Electoral results for the Division of Hawker § 1980

Hindmarsh 
This section is an excerpt from Electoral results for the Division of Hindmarsh § 1980

Kingston 
This section is an excerpt from Electoral results for the Division of Kingston § 1980

Port Adelaide 
This section is an excerpt from Electoral results for the Division of Port Adelaide § 1980

Sturt 
This section is an excerpt from Electoral results for the Division of Sturt § 1980

Wakefield 
This section is an excerpt from Electoral results for the Division of Wakefield § 1980

Western Australia

Canning 
This section is an excerpt from Electoral results for the Division of Canning § 1980

Curtin 
This section is an excerpt from Electoral results for the Division of Curtin § 1980

Forrest 
This section is an excerpt from Electoral results for the Division of Forrest § 1980

Fremantle 
This section is an excerpt from Electoral results for the Division of Fremantle § 1980

Kalgoorlie 
This section is an excerpt from Electoral results for the Division of Kalgoorlie § 1980

Moore 
This section is an excerpt from Electoral results for the Division of Moore § 1980

O'Connor 
This section is an excerpt from Electoral results for the Division of O'Connor § 1980

Perth 
This section is an excerpt from Electoral results for the Division of Perth § 1980

Stirling 
This section is an excerpt from Electoral results for the Division of Stirling § 1980

Swan 
This section is an excerpt from Electoral results for the Division of Swan § 1980

Tangney 
This section is an excerpt from Electoral results for the Division of Tangney § 1980

Tasmania

Bass 
This section is an excerpt from Electoral results for the Division of Bass § 1980

Braddon 
This section is an excerpt from Electoral results for the Division of Braddon § 1980

Denison 
This section is an excerpt from Electoral results for the Division of Denison § 1980

Franklin 
This section is an excerpt from Electoral results for the Division of Franklin § 1980

Wilmot 
This section is an excerpt from Electoral results for the Division of Wilmot § 1980

Australian Capital Territory

Canberra 
This section is an excerpt from Electoral results for the Division of Canberra § 1980

Fraser 
This section is an excerpt from Electoral results for the Division of Fraser (Australian Capital Territory) § 1980

Northern Territory 

This section is an excerpt from Electoral results for the Division of Northern Territory § 1980

See also 
 Candidates of the 1980 Australian federal election
 Members of the Australian House of Representatives, 1980–1983
 Results of the 1980 Australian federal election (Senate)

References 

House of Representatives 1980